Peter Kuračka (born 13 July 1978) is a Slovak football midfielder.

He came to Trnava in January 2012 and made his debut for them against Zlaté Moravce on 3 March 2012.

References

1978 births
Living people
Slovak footballers
ŠK Slovan Bratislava players
FC ViOn Zlaté Moravce players
FC Spartak Trnava players
Spartak Myjava players
Slovak Super Liga players
Association football midfielders
People from Myjava
Sportspeople from the Trenčín Region